Members of the New South Wales Legislative Assembly who served in the 36th  parliament held their seats from 1950 to 1953. They were elected at the 1950 state election, and at by-elections. The Speaker was Bill Lamb.

See also
Third McGirr ministry
First Cahill ministry
Results of the 1950 New South Wales state election
Candidates of the 1950 New South Wales state election

References

Members of New South Wales parliaments by term
20th-century Australian politicians